Ivar Magnus Ryberg (24 August 1885 – 2 January 1929) was a Swedish rower who competed in the 1912 Summer Olympics. He was a crew member of the Swedish boat Göteborgs that was eliminated in the first round of the men's eight tournament. Ryberg was also an association football player and won five national titles. He played in the international match Sweden-England (Amateurs) in Hull in 1909.

Earlier on, Ryberg lived in Hamburg where he played soccer for both clubs which were to become Hamburger SV. In 1908, he also won the North German Discus Throwing title, achieving 33 m 28 cm.

References

External links

1885 births
1929 deaths
Swedish male rowers
Olympic rowers of Sweden
Swedish footballers
Sweden international footballers
Rowers at the 1912 Summer Olympics
Association footballers not categorized by position